Koning Eizenberg Architecture (KEA) is an architecture firm located in Santa Monica, California established in 1981. The firm is recognized for a range of project types including: adaptive reuse of historic buildings, educational facilities, community places, and housing. Principals Hank Koning, Julie Eizenberg, Brian Lane, and Nathan Bishop work collaboratively with developers, cities and not-for-profit clients. Their work has been published extensively both in the US and abroad, and has earned over 125 awards for design, sustainability and historic preservation.

Koning Eizenberg Architecture’s work has been included in academic and popular publications including USA:Modern Architectures in History and A Guide to Contemporary Architecture in America Vol. 1. Koning Eizenberg projects have also been published in magazines including I.D., Metropolitan Home, Architectural Record, Travel + Leisure, Residential Architect, Vanity Fair, Metropolis, and Abitare, as well as in two monographs, Koning Eizenberg Buildings and Architecture isn’t just for special occasions.

Sustainable architecture
In the 1980s, Koning Eizenberg Architecture began using sustainable features in their designs such as passive cooling, healthy building strategies, and sustainable water management techniques. In 1999 Koning Eizenberg designed and built their current studio as a demonstration project in economy and sustainability. Their office is recognized by the architectural community as well as the city of Santa Monica and state of California for its contribution to environmental responsiveness.

Koning Eizenberg's sustainably oriented projects include LEED projects like the Children's Museum of Pittsburgh, the largest LEED Silver Museum in the United States, and Virginia Avenue Park (Santa Monica, California), the first LEED accredited park to be completed in the US, with a LEED Silver certification.

Projects

Century Building and Commuter Bike Center (Pittsburgh, Pennsylvania)
    
Utilizing State Historic Tax Credits the Century building was renovated under the concept of adaptive reuse and completed in 2010. The twelve-story building is now included on the National Register of Historic Places and houses a restaurant, two floors of offices, and 60 units of mixed-income housing (40% affordable) provided in lofts, one bedroom, and two bedroom units. A rooftop garden and club room are available to all residents and tenants. Notable sustainable features include a geothermal energy system and an innovative on-site bike center for use by residents and the public.

Children's Museum of Pittsburgh (Pittsburgh, Pennsylvania)
    
The Children's Museum of Pittsburgh and its exhibits were redesigned in 2000 with construction completed in 2005. A new entry and exhibition space over an existing road was built to connect a national register 1890s post office with a 1939 planetarium, highlighting the two historic stone landmarks with a contrasting steel and glass-framed space, wrapped in translucent five-inch hinged plastic flaps that move in the wind and reflect light (designed with Ned Kahn). When completed, the museum was the largest Silver LEED museum in the country, featuring adaptive reuse, recycled materials, and passive shading.

Virginia Avenue Park (Santa Monica, California)

The expanded and renovated Virginia Avenue Park masterplan had to address the ethnically diverse neighborhood Pico Neighborhood in Santa Monica, California. Renovated warehouses and a refreshed 1960s community building introduce progressive ideas about form while providing spaces for children, teens, families and seniors. Facilities include art rooms, movement spaces, a computer lab as well as fields, basketball courts, play equipment, and an interactive fountain. At the time of its completion in 2005, it was the first park to be certified LEED silver in the country as achieved by onsite water management, adaptive reuse of buildings, daylighting and sustainable materials.

Historic Farmers Market (Los Angeles, California)
    
In 1998, plans to build an adjacent shopping center – The Grove – set in motion a complementary master plan for the designated city cultural site of the Los Angeles Farmers Market. Centered on reviving and enhancing the historic property, the plan also facilitated pedestrian traffic between the two developments, while providing surface parking for market patrons. The plan and remodel reorganized services and added large retail spaces while attempting to maintain the utilitarian and authentic personality of the Market at its completion in 2002.

The Standard Hotel Downtown LA (Los Angeles, California)

The Standard Hotel used state preservation tax credits to convert the original Superior Oil Co. Headquarters. Existing features – such as the exterior, front doors, and lobby – anchor the design. To accommodate guest traffic, the renovation moved the primary entry to the rear, adding an outdoor lounge and dining area. On the upper floors, deep office floorplates necessitated extensive reworking and special configuration of the guest rooms. A rooftop pool and bar were also added by the time work was completed in 2002.

AMP Lofts (Los Angeles, California)
    
The AMP lofts were designed as a 180-unit live-work community at 7th and Santa Fe, just south of downtown Los Angeles. Two-story live/work units are located at the street and 5,000 sf of retail is located at the southwest corner to stimulate street activity. The green-screened parking structure acts as a podium for loft units. On the podium, the three-bar organization allows for integral open-air streets, courts, overhead walkways, daylight to below, and cross-ventilation for all higher units.

Awards
2019 Australian Institute of Architects Gold Medal
2012 AIA|LA Gold Medal
2009 AIA California Council Firm of the Year Award
2007 Rudy Bruner Gold Medal Award, Children’s Museum of Pittsburgh

References

External links
 Official website

Architecture firms based in California
Santa Monica, California